Gary Burgess Kirner (born June 22, 1942) is a former American football offensive lineman in the American Football League who played for the San Diego Chargers. He played college football for the USC Trojans. Won all conference for USC in 1962 and 1963.

References

1942 births
Living people
American football offensive linemen
San Diego Chargers players
USC Trojans football players